Lake Dil, a.k.a. Karine Lagoon, ( or Karine Lagünü) is a lagoon in the Aegean Region of Turkey.

Being a lagoon it is used as a fishery. Doğanbey  is the only settlement on the coast of the lake.

There are also smaller lagoons to the south of Dil. Their names are Arapça, Tuzla, Mavi, Kokar, Koca and Bölme.

References

Tourist attractions in Aydın Province
Dil
Dil
Landforms of Aydın Province
Söke District